Anton Pichler (April 12, 1697 – September 14, 1779) was a Tyrolean goldsmith and artist of engraved gems, and the son of a doctor.

Pichler was born in Brixen.  He studied in Naples and worked for the Bourbon court later moving, in 1743, to Rome, where he lived to his death. Pichler's gems include: Antigone and Ismene before the Temple of the Furies, the Father of the Returning from Thebes advisors (a large Onyx), and Priamos at the Feet of Achilles (after an owners concept); a great bust of Homer; the Head of Julius Caesar; Meleager, after the Statue in the Vatican; the Bacchanal of Michelangelo, the signet ring.

Pichler died in Rome, aged 82. His sons, Giovanni and Luigi, were also famous gem cutters.

References

Further reading 
 Hermann Rollett: Die drei Meister der Gemmoglyptik Antonio, Giovanni und Luigi Pichler: eine biographisch-kunstgeschichtliche Darstellung. Vienna, 1874.

1697 births
1779 deaths
People from Brixen
German artists
Italian artists
Italian people of Austrian descent
Italian people of German descent
Engraved gem artists
18th-century Italian artists

Catholic engravers